Paul Tucker (born 30 January 1976) is a Guyanese hurdler. He competed in the men's 110 metres hurdles at the 1996 Summer Olympics.

References

1976 births
Living people
Athletes (track and field) at the 1996 Summer Olympics
Athletes (track and field) at the 2000 Summer Olympics
Guyanese male hurdlers
Olympic athletes of Guyana
Athletes (track and field) at the 1999 Pan American Games
Pan American Games competitors for Guyana
Place of birth missing (living people)